This is a list of Grand Valley State Lakers football players in the NFL Draft.

Key

Selections

References

Grand Valley State

Grand Valley State Lakers NFL Draft